Nijmegen Dukenburg is a railway station located in the south west of Nijmegen, Netherlands. The station was opened on 2 June 1973 and is located on the Tilburg–Nijmegen railway. The train services are operated by Nederlandse Spoorwegen. The main station of Nijmegen is Nijmegen railway station.

Train services

The following services currently call at Nijmegen Dukenburg:
2x per hour local services (Sprinter) Nijmegen - Oss - 's-Hertogenbosch
2x per hour local services (Sprinter) Wijchen - Nijmegen - Zutphen

Bus services
There is a bus station near the station, also called Nijmegen Dukenburg. The name of this station used to be Brabantse Poort but was changed at the end of 2013 after an online poll.

 2 - Weezenhof - Nijmegen Dukenburg - Nijmegen (Centraal Station) - Plein 1944 - Novio
 3 - St. Maartens Clinic - Plein 1944 - Nijmegen (Centraal Station) - Station Heyendaal - University - CWZ Hospital - Nijmegen Dukenburg - Wijchen North - Wijchen - Novio
 4 - St. Maartens Clinic - Plein 1944 - Nijmegen (Centraal Station) - Station Heyendaal - University - CWZ Hospital - Nijmegen Dukenburg - Wijchen South - Wijchen - Novio
 6 - Nijmegen Dukenburg - Hatert - University Hospital - Nijmegen (Centraal Station) - Plein 1944 - Neerbosch-Oost - Novio
 7 - Nijmegen Dukenburg - Lindenholt West - Plein 1944 - Nijmegen (Centraal Station) - Brakkenstein - Novio
 11 - Beuningen - Lindenholt Oost - Nijmegen Dukenburg - CWZ Hospital - University - Station Heyendaal  - Nijmegen (Centraal Station) (Does not operate between Nijmegen Dukenburg and Centraal Station on Saturdays, Service does not operate Evenings and Sundays) - Hermes
 87 - Nijmegen (Centraal Station) - Nijmegen Dukenburg - Druten - Hermes
 99 - Nijmegen (Centraal Station) - Nijmegen Dukenburg - Alverna - Nederasselt - Grave - Velp - Reek - Zeeland - Uden - Hermes

These services are both town and regional services. More regional services operate from the Centraal Station.

References

External links
NS website 
Dutch Public Transport journey planner 

Dukenburg
Railway stations opened in 1973